Rainbow is an unincorporated community in Placer County, California. It lies at an elevation of 5781 feet (1762 m).

References

Unincorporated communities in California
Unincorporated communities in Placer County, California